Adam Baumann (27 March 1948 – 6 September 2021) was a Polish actor.

References

1948 births
2021 deaths
People from Grudziądz
Polish male stage actors
Polish male film actors
Polish male television actors
Recipients of the Gold Cross of Merit (Poland)
Recipients of the Silver Cross of Merit (Poland)
Recipients of the Bronze Cross of Merit (Poland)
Recipients of the Silver Medal for Merit to Culture – Gloria Artis
Recipients of the Bronze Medal for Merit to Culture – Gloria Artis
Recipient of the Meritorious Activist of Culture badge